Lnáře is a municipality and village in Strakonice District in the South Bohemian Region of the Czech Republic. It has about 700 inhabitants.

Administrative parts
The village of Zahorčice is an administrative part of Lnáře.

Etymology
The name Lnáře is derived from the Slavonic word lnář (meaning person who cultivate, process, or sale flax). The German name is derived from Schlüssel (means "key") and Burg (means "castle"). It refers to a key worn in coat of arms of the noble family of Schlüsselberg who probably founded the local aristocratic residence.

Geography
It lies in the Blatná Uplands.

The built-up area is situated on the shores of three ponds, connected by the Smolivecký Stream: Veský, Zámecký and Podhájský. The fourth large pond in the municipal territory is Nový in the southern part.

History
The first written mention of Lnáře is from 1318, when it is written about the then owner of the village Habart of Lnáře. The village of Zahorčice is first mentioned in 1383. In the 14th century, the tradition of pond farming began. Pond farming and forestry became the main source of lordship income for next centuries. The first mention of the stronghold and the pond below it is from 1465. 

In 1899, the railroad to the towns of Blatná and Nepomuk was built. The construction of national route I/20 in 1931 and 1953–1954 (now part of the European route E49) through Lnáře further improved the transport accessibility of the municipality.

Sights

Lnáře has two castles: the Lnáře Stronghold (also called Old Stronghold) and the Lnáře Castle (also called New Castle). The Old Stronghold was built before 1318 and rebuilt in the Renaissance style around 1597. After it ceased to satisfy the comforts of a manor's residence, the neighbouring castle was built. Today the Old Stronghold houses the tourist infocentre and a gallery.

The Lnáře Castle is a Baroque building, surrounded by a  large English park. The representative rooms of the castle are richly decorated with wall and ceiling frescoes with scenes from ancient mythology. The Great Hall, which is one of the largest Baroque halls in Central Europe, is used for social events. The castle offers sightseeing tours and also serves as a hotel and restaurant.

Other sights include the monastery of the Discalced Augustinians founded in 1684 by the Church of the Holy Trinity. The church itself was built in 1599 and extended in the early Baroque style in 1666. Since 1965, the building of the monastery is used as a psychiatric hospital.

Other ecclesiastical buildings in Lnáře include the Catholic Church of Saint Nicholas with a cemetery, Chapel of Saint Anne, and a chapel in Zahořice.

Notable people
Karolina Slunéčková (1934–1983), actress; lived here and is buried here

References

External links

Villages in Strakonice District